Nyoni is a town in Ilembe District Municipality in the KwaZulu-Natal province of South Africa.

References

Populated places in the Mandeni Local Municipality